Oedalea is a genus of flies belonging to the family Hybotidae.

The species of this genus are found in Europe and Northern America.

Species:
 Microphorus putidus (Meunier, 1908) 
 Oedalea apicalis Loew, 1859

References

Hybotidae